Yaasier 'Yaya' Hartzenberg (born 6 January 1989) is a South African rugby union player for the  in the Currie Cup and the Rugby Challenge.

External links

1989 births
Living people
Alumni of Paarl Boys' High School
Pumas (Currie Cup) players
Rugby union flankers
Selkirk RFC players
South Africa Under-20 international rugby union players
South African people of German descent
South African rugby union players
Rugby union players from Cape Town
Western Province (rugby union) players